Adegaon is a town and a Gram Panchayat in Seoni district in the Indian state of Madhya Pradesh. It is known for its Shri Kala Bhairava Nath Swami Temple.

References 

Cities and towns in Seoni district